Mastigodryas is a genus of colubrid snakes. Like some other colubrids, they are commonly called racers. It is a Neotropical genus, with members distributed from Mexico to Argentina and several islands in the Caribbean. Some authorities use the older generic name, Dryadophis, for these species.

Description
These snakes are cylindrical or somewhat laterally compressed in shape. The head is distinct from the rest of the body, as in many other colubrids. They have large eyes. They have Duvernoy's glands. The morphology of the hemipenis in various species has been helpful in elucidating their relationships, as little is known about the evolutionary origins of the genus.

Behavior
These snakes are diurnal and actively forage for their prey.

Diet
The diet is varied. For example, Mastigodryas bifossatus is euryphagic, consuming a wide variety of prey items. A large part of its diet is made up of frogs, and it will also take various mammals, birds, lizards, and other snakes.

Species
There are 13 species. There may be as many as 18 if certain subspecies are elevated to species status, as has been suggested.

Species include:
Mastigodryas alternatus 
Mastigodryas amarali 
Mastigodryas boddaerti 
Mastigodryas bruesi 
Mastigodryas cliftoni 
Mastigodryas danieli 
Mastigodryas dorsalis 
Mastigodryas heathii 
Mastigodryas melanolomus 
Mastigodryas moratoi 
Mastigodryas pleii 
Mastigodryas pulchriceps 
Mastigodryas reticulatus 

Nota bene: A binomial authority in parentheses indicates that the species was originally described in a genus other than Mastigodryas.

The species, Mastigodryas reticulatus , has been returned to its original name, Herpetodryas reticulata .

References

Further reading
Freiberg M (1982). Snakes of South America. Hong Kong: T.F.H. Publications. 189 pp. . (Mastigodryas, pp. 66–67, 77, 103-104, 131, 136-137).
https://serpientesdevenezuela.org/mastigodryas-pleei/
https://serpientesdevenezuela.org/mastigodryas-boddaerti/

Colubrids
Taxa named by Afrânio Pompílio Gastos do Amaral
Snake genera